The Hon. John Charles Dundas (21 September 1845 – 13 September 1892), was a British Liberal politician.

Background
Dundas was a younger son of the Hon. John Dundas, younger son of Lawrence Dundas, 1st Earl of Zetland. His mother was Margaret Matilda, daughter of James Talbot, while Lawrence Dundas, 1st Marquess of Zetland, was his elder brother. When his elder brother succeeded in the earldom of Zetland in 1873, Dundas was granted the rank of a younger son of an earl, and thus styled the Honourable John Dundas.

Political career
Dundas was returned to Parliament for Richmond, Yorkshire, in 1873 (succeeding his elder brother), a seat he held until 1885. He was also Lord Lieutenant of Orkney and Shetland between 1872 and 1892.

Family
Dundas married the Hon. Alice Louisa, daughter of Charles Wood, 1st Viscount Halifax, in 1870. He died in September 1892, aged 46. His wife survived him by over 40 years and died in June 1934.

References

External links 
 

1845 births
1892 deaths
Liberal Party (UK) MPs for English constituencies
Lord Lieutenants of Orkney and Shetland
UK MPs 1868–1874
UK MPs 1874–1880
UK MPs 1880–1885